Bosque de Fray Jorge national park or Bosque Fray Jorge national park (Spanish Parque Nacional Bosque Fray Jorge) lies in the Limarí Province, Coquimbo Region, Chile. It is a UNESCO biosphere reserve. Management of this and other national parks in Chile is entrusted to Corporacion Nacional Forestal, CONAF.

Geography  
 
The national park lies approximately 100 km south of La Serena on the Pacific Ocean, as well as approximately 30 km to the west of Ovalle. It lies close to the Atacama Desert, in the Cordillera de Talinay, which is part of the Chilean Coastal Range. On the south, the park is bordered by the Limarí River, whose lower reaches have been designated as a protected Ramsar site since 2020.

The park covers an area of 100 km², but the forests cover only 4% of its surface. The national park is known for having the northernmost Valdivian temperate rain forests. The coastal fog (Spanish: Camanchaca) hangs on the mountain-slopes and moistens subtropical vegetation, allowing the hydrophilic forests to survive despite being surrounded by semiarid scrublands, with average annual rainfall of approximately 113 mm. The forest is a vestigial survival of the last glacial period. However, recent genetic research based on metazoans, suggests that the Fray Jorge Forest is a relic of the forests that occupied this landscape during the Paleogene / Neogene, which retracted due to the aridification of the region, with an approximate age of divergence with the southern forests of over 20 million years old.

Typical plants of the national park include: 
 Peruvian pepper (Schinus latifolius)
 Azara celastrina 
 Lithraea venenosa 
 Porlieria chilensis 
 Olivillo (Aextoxicon punctatum) 
 Epiphytes include Sarmienta scandens and Griselinia scandens.

The park also includes a large number of smaller animals, as common degu, chinchilla and foxes. Many different kinds of birds live in the park, such as the Chilean tinamou (Nothoprocta perdicaria) and the long-tailed meadowlark (Sturnella loyca).

History  
 
The place where today the Fray Jorge National Park is located was discovered in 1627 by a priest of the Franciscan order, who, due to a lack of timber in the area, set out to search for it with the help of some mules. After "miraculously" finding it at this location, he brought back some timber and used it to build part of the bell tower of the Church of San Francisco in La Serena.
The Bosque de Fray Jorge national park was created in 1941 and is administered by the Chilean forest authority CONAF. UNESCO incorporated the national park as a biosphere reservation in 1977.

See also

Cloud forest

References

3. Phylogeography of Plectostylus Beck, 1837 (Gastropoda: Stylommatophora: Orthalicoidea): Origin and isolation of the Fray Jorge forest relicts in northern Chile Article in Journal of Zoological Systematics and Evolutionary Research 57(1) DOI: 10.1111/jzs.12242
 Translation from the Spanish and German Wikipedia sites (see interwiki links).

External links
 Fray Jorge Biosphere Reserve

National parks of Chile
Bosque de Fray Jorge
Protected areas of Coquimbo Region
Protected areas established in 1941
Oases of Chile
Ramsar sites in Chile
Valdivian temperate rainforest